Union Township is a township in Lebanon County, Pennsylvania, United States. It is part of the Lebanon, Pennsylvania Metropolitan Statistical Area. The population was 2,925 at the 2020 census.

History
Waterville Bridge in the township was added to the National Register of Historic Places in 1980.

Geography
According to the U.S. Census Bureau, the township has a total area of 29.9 square miles (77.5 km), of which 29.9 square miles (77.5 km) is land and 0.04 square mile (0.1 km; 0.07%) is water. Part of Fort Indiantown Gap occupies the western part of the township. Lickdale is in the east, next to Swatara Creek.

Recreation
Portions of the Appalachian Trail, Pennsylvania State Game Lands Number 80, and Swatara State Park are located along the northern part of the township.

Demographics
At the 2000 census there were 2,590 people, 1,017 households, and 733 families in the township.  The population density was 86.6 people per square mile (33.4/km).  There were 1,105 housing units at an average density of 36.9/sq mi (14.3/km).  The racial makeup of the township was 98.15% White, 0.19% African American, 0.23% Native American, 0.31% Asian, 0.35% from other races, and 0.77% from two or more races. Hispanic or Latino people of any race were 0.81%.

There were 1,017 households, 27.4% had children under the age of 18 living with them, 58.5% were married couples living together, 7.9% had a female householder with no husband present, and 27.9% were non-families. 21.7% of households were made up of individuals, and 7.4% were one person aged 65 or older.  The average household size was 2.55 and the average family size was 2.94.

In the township the population was spread out, with 21.9% under the age of 18, 8.3% from 18 to 24, 29.0% from 25 to 44, 27.4% from 45 to 64, and 13.4% 65 or older.  The median age was 40 years. For every 100 females, there were 104.7 males.  For every 100 females age 18 and over, there were 103.9 males.

The median household income was $42,669 and the median family income was $51,157. Males had a median income of $34,758 versus $23,125 for females. The per capita income for the township was $19,896.  About 5.1% of families and 6.5% of the population were below the poverty line, including 5.7% of those under age 18 and 8.3% of those age 65 or over.

References

External links

Townships in Lebanon County, Pennsylvania
Townships in Pennsylvania